This is a list of bishops of Grenoble.

 381–384 : Saint Domnin 
         : Diogene
         : Amicus 
 420     : Sebastian
 439–?   : Vitalien
 441–459 : Saint Cérat
 463–478 : Viventius
 515–530 : Viktor
 538     : Ursolus 
 552–570 : Siagrius I
 573–601/608 : Isice I
 614–626 : Siagrius II
 650     : Clair 
 653–664 : Saint Ferreol
 664     : Boson 
 690     : Isice II
 699     : Austrebert
 707     : Ramnou 
 726     : Ragnomar 
 742     : Austoric 
 743–?   : Corbus 
 760     : Leopert 
 804     : Adalhard
 825     : Radou 
 829     : Supert
 –       : Evrard 
 840     : Adalulf
 855–860 : Ebbo
 869–?   : Bernaire
 888–922 : Isaak 
 944–949 : Alquier 
 949–990 : Isarn
 990–1025  : Humbert I. d`Albon
 1025–1035 : Mallen
 1036–1058 : Artaud
 1058–     : Humbert II
 1070–1076 : Pons
 1080–1132 : Hugues I, later canonised
 1132–1148 : Hugues II
 1148–1150 : Nöel
 1150–1151 : Othmar de Sassenage
 1151–1163 : Geoffroy
 1164–1220 : Jean de Sassenage
 1220–1221 : Guillaume I
 1221–1223 : Pierre I
 1223–1237 : Soffroy
 1237–1250 : Pierre II
 1250–1266 : Falcon
 1266–1281 : Guillaume II de Sassenage
 1281–1302 : Guillaume III de Royn
 1302–1337 : Guillaume IV de Royn
 1337–1351 : Jean de Chissé
 1351–1380 : Rodolphe de Chissé (later bishop of Tarentaise)
 1380–1388 : François de Conzié (later bishop of Arles)
 1388–1427 : Aymon I de Chissé O.S.B. (later bishop of Nice)
 1427–1450 : Aymon II de Chissé
 1450–1476 : Siboud Alleman de Séchilienne
 1476–1482 : Laurent Alleman I de Laval
 1482–1484 : Jost von Silenen
 1484–1518 : Laurent Alleman I de Laval
 1518–1561 : Laurent Alleman II de Laval
 1562–1575 : François d`Avançon O.S.B.
 1575–1606 : François du Pléard (also named du Fléhard)
 1607–1619 : Jean de La Croix de Chevrières
 1619–1620 : Alphonse de La Croix de Chevrières
 1620–1668 : Pierre Scarron
 1671–1707 : Étienne Le Camus (also cardinal)
 1708–1719 : Ennemond Allemand de Montmartin
 1721–1725 : Paul de Chaulnes (before bishop of Sarlat)
 1726–1771 : Jean de Caulet
 1771–1779 : Jean de Cairol de Madaillan (before bishop of Vence)
 1779–1788 : Hippolyte Haÿ de Bonteville (before bishop of Saint-Flour)
 1789–1802 : Jean-Marie du Lau d'Allemans

In 1790 the ancien régime and the diocese were abolished by the French revolutionaries.  The diocese was restored in 1791 and was given constitutional bishops by the regime.

 1791–1792 : Joseph Pouchot (constitutional bishop)
 1792–1802 : Henri Reymond (constitutional bishop, later bishop of Dijon)

In 1801 the diocese was restored.

 1802–1825 : Claude Simon
 1826–1852 : Philibert de Bruillard
 1853–1870 : Jacques-Marie-Achille Ginoulhiac (later archbishop of Lyon)
 1870–1875 : Pierre-Antoine-Justin Paulinier (later archbishop of Besançon)
 1875–1899 : Amand-Joseph Fava
 1899–1911 : Paul-Émile Henry
 1911–1916 : Louis-Joseph Maurin (later archbishop of Lyon)
 1917–1957 : Alexandre Caillot
 1957–1969 : André-Jacques Fougerat (later titular bishop of Alba de Numidie)
 1969–1989 : Gabriel-Marie-Joseph Matagrin
 1989–2006 : Louis Jean Dufaux
 2006–2021 : Guy de Kerimel
 2022–present : Jean-Marc Eychenne

References